Brave Man Standing, is a Thai action drama lakorn, loosely based on an older Thai film of the same name. The lakorn became the highest rated lakorn in Thai history.  It starred Woranut Wongsawan and Nattawut Sakidjai as the leading couple, and also included Cee Siwat and Cheer with Anuchit and Benz P.

Summary 
A group of gangs lead the world into the bloody action of Bangkok, Thailand.  The atmosphere of animosity between the bad guys and good guys unlock everyone's experiences of beginning to find the chains within true love, family, and friends.

Reception 
Kom Faek got enormous success from viewers. According to AGB Nielsen Media Research, it brought a big hit on screen which received 17 rate in its opening weekend and ended with 25 rate came from 14,916,000 viewers. The Lakorn finally set the record for the highest rated lakorn in history as well as began one of Ch7’s hit makers for the second half of the year. Moreover, Thairath Newspaper Finally reported that the winner for Best Lakorn of 2008 goes to Kom Faek along with Nang Tard and Dao Puen Din for CH 7 winner.

References

External links 
  Official Website
  Siam Zone

Thai television soap operas
2008 Thai television series debuts
2008 Thai television series endings
Channel 7 (Thailand) original programming
2000s Thai television series